Columbia Hills can refer to the following:

Columbia Hills (Washington), an area of hills in Washington state, USA
Columbia Hills State Park, a Washington state park in the area of the same name.
Columbia Hills (Mars), a range of low hills inside Gusev crater on Mars